Mohammed Ahmed Taqi Al-Lawati (born 12 September 1985), commonly known as Mohammed Taqi, is an Omani footballer who plays as a striker for Oman Professional League club Al-Wusta.

Club career
On 1 August 2013, he signed a one-year contract with Al-Shabab. On 14 August 2014, he signed a one-year contract with Bosher. He made his debut and scored his first goal for Bosher on 11 September 2014, in a 2–2 draw against his former club Al-Shabab.

International career
Mohammed was selected for the national team for the first time in 2005. He has made one appearance in the 2010 FIFA World Cup qualification.

Career statistics

Club

References

External links
 
 
 
 

1985 births
Living people
People from Muscat, Oman
Omani footballers
Oman international footballers
Association football forwards
Al-Musannah SC players
Muscat Club players
Dhofar Club players
Suwaiq Club players
Al-Nahda Club (Oman) players
Al-Shabab SC (Seeb) players
Bowsher Club players
Oman Professional League players
Expatriate footballers in Kuwait
Omani expatriate sportspeople in Kuwait
Kuwait Premier League players